The Charm of the Highway Strip is the third studio album by American indie pop band The Magnetic Fields, released in 1994. It was the fourth Magnetic Fields album to be recorded, but was released five months prior to their intended third album Holiday, which was delayed for more than a year due to label issues. The Charm of the Highway Strip was also the band's debut release on Merge Records.

Content 

Its title, lyrics and musical styling are a nod to country music, though the songs of Stephin Merritt remain rooted in classic pop and synthesizers. Virtually every song deals with roads and travel, and several songs' lyrics implicitly reference vampires.

The title of the album comes from a quote by J. B. Jackson, 1959: "Let us hope that the merits and charm of the highway strip are not so obscure but that they will be accepted by a wider public."

This is the group's first full album in which songwriter Merritt also takes lead vocals. He designed the record's cover art, and has stated it is the album of his he is most satisfied with thus far in his career.

Legacy 

Arcade Fire covered "Born on a Train" during a live performance on the KCRW program Morning Becomes Eclectic. Lush covered "I Have the Moon" as a B-side on their 1996 single "500 (Shake Baby Shake)". The song was also included on the B-sides collection Topolino and on the Chorus box set.

The song "Dust Bowl" was used during an episode of the television series version of This American Life ("Pandora's Box").

Indie rock band Country Westerns included a cover of "Two Characters in Search of a Country Song" as the final track on their self-titled debut album.

Track listing
All songs written by Stephin Merritt.

Personnel
The Magnetic Fields
Stephin Merritt – vocals, instrumentation
Claudia Gonson – management
Sam Davol – cello

References 

1994 albums
The Magnetic Fields albums